Nonante-Cinq is the second studio album by Belgian singer Angèle. It was released on 3 December 2021 through Angèle's own label Angèle VL Records and Initial Artist Services. The album was preceded by two singles: "Bruxelles je t'aime", and "Démons" featuring Damso.

The album reached number one in Wallonia, as well as the top five in Flanders and France. It moved 30,958 units in France in its debut week, 17,530 of which were physical sales.

A reissue of the album, subtitled La Suite, was released on 17 November 2022.

Background and release
Talking about the development, she revealed that the sadness and melancholy caused by the break-up between her and Léo Walk, as well as the COVID-19 lockdowns, were "catalysts" of the writing process; although, she admitted, the sadness felt more intense during the creation of her debut studio album Brol.

After the release of the lead single "Bruxelles je t'aime" on 21 October 2021, Angèle announced the album on 27 October. She also revealed the album cover which depicts her riding a rollercoaster along with different versions of herself. The title refers to her birth year 1995. The album was originally scheduled to be released on 10 December but was spontaneously moved up one week because of Angèle's 26th birthday on 3 December. After having contracted COVID-19 a week prior to the release, she chose to host a virtual release party on her Instagram. Accompanied by a music video, the song "Démons" with French rapper Damso was released as the second single the same day.

Tour 
The Nonante-Cinq Tour was announced in late October, 2021 to promote the album. Initially with 24 dates, the tour was expanded several times with additional arena shows and festival appearances. The ongoing tour is visiting 5 countries, including France, Spain, Switzerland, Canada, and Belgium.

Track listing

Charts

Weekly charts

Year-end charts

Certifications

References

2021 albums
French-language albums
Self-released albums